A first edition is the first set of copies of a book printed from substantially the same setting of type.

(The) First Edition may also refer to:

Music
 First Edition (Paper Lace album), 1972
 First Edition (George Shearing and Jim Hall album), 1981
 First Edition (Dei Hamo album), 2005
 The First Edition (band), a country music/rock band, later known as "Kenny Rogers and the First Edition"
 The First Edition (album), 1967 debut album
 First Edition Records, a record label owned by the Louisville Orchestra

Film & Television
 First Edition (film), 1977 American short documentary film
 First Edition (Australian TV program), a long running Australian breakfast news program
 First Edition (TV series), defunct news program on Irish television netword TV3
 "The First Edition", an episode of The Waltons

See also
 
 
 Second Edition (disambiguation)